Frizzled-5 (Fz-5) is a protein that in humans is encoded by the FZD5 gene.

Members of the 'frizzled' gene family encode 7-transmembrane domain proteins that are receptors for Wnt signaling proteins. Fz-5  is believed to be the receptor for the Wnt5A ligand.

References

Further reading

External links

G protein-coupled receptors